
This is a list of past and present members of the Académie des Beaux-Arts in Section III: Architecture.

Seat #1

 elected 1795 : Jacques Gondouin (1737–1818)
 1819 : Maximilien Joseph Hurtault (1765–1824)
 1824 : Pierre-Jules Delespine (1756–1825)
 1825 : Louis-Hippolyte Lebas (1782–1867)
 1868 : Léon Vaudoyer (1803–1872)
 1872 : Théodore Ballu (1817–1885)
 1885 : Honoré Daumet (1826–1911)
 1912 : Edmond Paulin (1848–1915)
 1918 : Henri Deglane (1855–1931)
 1931 : Paul Bigot (1870–1942)
 1943 : Auguste Perret (1874–1954)
 1954 : Roger-Henri Expert (1882–1955)
 1956 : Charles Nicod (1878–1967)
 1968 :  (1911–1975)
 1976 : Jacques Couëlle (1902–1996)
 1998 : André Wogenscky (1916–2004)
 2008 : Jacques Rougerie (born 1945)

Seat #2

 1795 : Antoine-François Peyre (1739–1823)
 1823 : Antoine Vaudoyer (1756–1846)
 1846 : Jean-Baptiste Lesueur (1794–1883)
 1884 : Louis-Jules André (1819–1890)
 1890 : Jean-Louis Pascal (1837–1920)
 1920 : Jean-Camille Formigé (1845–1926)
 1926 : Alexandre Marcel (1860–1928)
 1928 : Alphonse Defrasse (1860–1939)
 1939 :  (1879–1964)
 1961 : Noël Le Maresquier (1903–1982)
 1983 : Bernard Zehrfuss (1911–1996)
 1998 :  (1925–2011)
 2015 : Jean-Michel Wilmotte (born 1948)

Seat #3

 1795 : Pierre-Adrien Pâris (1745–1819)
 1796 : Léon Dufourny (1754–1818)
 1818 : Jean-Thomas Thibault (1757–1826)
 1826 : Éloi Labarre (1764–1833)
 1833 : Auguste Guenepin (1780–1842)
 1842 : Martin-Pierre Gauthier (1790–1855)
 1855 : Hector Lefuel (1810–1880)
 1881 : Léon Ginain (1825–1898)
 1898 : Louis Bernier (1845–1919)
 1919 :  (1862–1958)
 1958 : Albert Laprade (1883–1978)
 1979 : Maurice Novarina (1907–2002)
 2008 :  (born 1936)

Seat #4

 1795 : Étienne-Louis Boullée (1728–1799)
 1799 : Jacques Denis Antoine (1733–1801)
 1801 : Jean-François Heurtier (1739–1822)
 1822 : Jean-Nicolas Huyot (1780–1840)
 1840 : Auguste Caristie (1783–1862)
 1863 : Victor Baltard (1805–1874)
 1874 : Charles Garnier (1825–1898)
 1898 : Constant Moyaux (1835–1911)
 1911 : Louis Marie Cordonnier (1854–1940)
 1942 : Jules Formigé (1879–1960)
 1961 :  (1898–1983)
 1983 : Roger Taillibert (1926–2019)
2021 : Anne Démians (born 1963)

Seat #5

 1795 : Charles De Wailly (1729–1798)
 1799 : Jean-François-Thérèse Chalgrin (1739–1811)
 1811 : Charles Percier (1764–1838)
 1838 : Jacques-Marie Huvé (1783–1852)
 1853 : Jacques-Ignace Hittorf (1792–1867)
 1867 : Henri Labrouste (1801–1875)
 1875 : Antoine-Nicolas Bailly (1810–1892)
 1892 : Gabriel-Auguste Ancelet (1829–1895)
 1895 : Henri-Paul Nénot (1853–1934)
 1935 : Gustave Umbdenstock (1866–1940)
 1942 : Paul Tournon (1881–1964)
 1965 :  (1890–1979)
 1979 :  (1908–1998)
 1999 :  (1924–2002)
 2005 : Claude Parent (1923–2016)
 2018 :  (born 1957)

Seat #6

 1795 : Jean-Arnaud Raymond (1742–1811)
 1811 : Pierre-François-Léonard Fontaine (1762–1853)
 1853 : Émile Jacques Gilbert (1793–1874)
 1875 : Paul Abadie (1812–1884)
 1884 : Arthur-Stanislas Diet (1827–1890)
 1890 : Alfred-Nicolas Normand (1822–1909)
 1909 : Victor Laloux (1850–1937)
 1938 : Charles Lemaresquier (1870–1972)
 1972 :  (1906–2008)
 2015 : Dominique Perrault (born 1953)

Seat #7

 1815 : Jean-Baptiste Rondelet (1743–1829)
 1829 : Jacques Molinos (1750–1831)
 1831 : Achille Leclère (1785–1853)
 1854 : Alphonse de Gisors (1796–1866)
 1867 : Joseph-Louis Duc  (1802–1879)
 1879 : Joseph Auguste Émile Vaudremer (1829–1914)
 1914 : Gaston Redon (1853–1921)
 1922 : Emmanuel Pontremoli (1865–1956)
 1957 : Jacques Carlu (1890–1976)
 1977 : Christian Langlois (1924–2007)
 2013 : Alain-Charles Perrot (born 1945)

Seat #8

 1815 : Jacques-Charles Bonnard (1765–1818)
 1818 : Bernard Poyet (1742–1824)
 1825 : François Debret (1777–1850)
 1850 : Guillaume Abel Blouet (1795–1853)
 1853 : Louis Visconti (1791–1853)
 1854 : Félix Duban (1797–1870)
 1871 : Charles-Auguste Questel (1807–1888)
 1888 : Georges-Ernest Coquart (1831–1902)
 1902 : Charles-Louis Girault (1851–1932)
 1933 : Henri Prost (1874–1959)
 1960 :  (1885–1967)
 1968 : Guillaume Gillet (1912–1987)
This seat was transferred to section VII in 1988.

Seat #9
 1968 : Henry Bernard (1912–1994)
 1996 : Paul Andreu (1938–2018)
 2019 :  (born 1959)

Seat #10
 2002 :  (1926–2018)
2018 :  (born 1953)

Sources
 List of members @ the Académie des Beaux-Arts website.

See also
List of Académie des Beaux-Arts members: Painting
List of Académie des Beaux-Arts members: Sculpture
List of Académie des Beaux-Arts members: Engraving
List of Académie des Beaux-Arts members: Music
List of Académie des Beaux-Arts members: Unattached
List of Académie des Beaux-Arts members: Cinema

 Architecture
French architects
Lists of French people
Lists of architects